Hjelmslev may refer to:

Persons
 Louis Hjelmslev
 Johannes Hjelmslev

Other
 Hjelmslev's theorem
 Hjelmslev transformation